Épineux-le-Seguin is a former commune in the Mayenne department in north-western France. On 1 January 2017, it was merged into the new commune Val-du-Maine.

See also
Communes of the Mayenne department

References

Former communes of Mayenne